Not Another Not Another Movie is a 2011 direct-to-video comedy film featuring Chevy Chase, Burt Reynolds and Michael Madsen.

Plot

Cast
 David Leo Schultz as Randy
 Vinnie Jones as Nancy Longbottom
 Michael Madsen as Lester Storm
 Ellie Gerber as Wendy
 Chevy Chase as Max Storm
 Burt Reynolds as C.J. Waters
 Richard Tyson as Himself
 Wolfgang Bodison as Himself
 James Duval as Himself
 Louis Mandylor as NASA Guy
 John Melendez as NASA Official

Reception 
Film critic Nathan Rabin heavily panned the movie, comparing it to other movies of the parody genre (particularly those by Jason Friedberg and Aaron Seltzer, whom he described as "comic terrorists who cavalierly destroy what others create for their own ugly self-interest") and calling Schultz "intensely non-charismatic", and concluding: "Worst of all, this overlong sketch of a movie lasts an interminable 99 minutes. If any film merits being a mere 70 minutes, it’s this abomination. Hell, it merits even less than that: It never should have been made in the first place, and now lingers as an enduring embarrassment in a rancid subgenre seemingly devoid of shame. Just how bad is it? It’s beyond dreadful. It’s sub-Seltzer-Friedberg, if that’s even possible."

References

External links
 
 

2011 films
American comedy films
American direct-to-video films
2011 comedy films
2010s English-language films
2010s American films